VGM may stand for:
 Video game music, a style of music
 Van Gogh Museum, a museum in Amsterdam named after the famous painter
 VGM (file format), a computer music file format used in old gaming consoles
 Verified Gross Mass (VERMAS or VGM), a SOLAS Convention  requirement for container weight as defined by the International Maritime Organisation that transmits container weight information
 Volo's Guide to Monsters, a supplement for the 5th edition Dungeons & Dragons roleplaying game